John Wesley Fitzgerald (born September 26, 1990) is an American politician currently serving his first term in the Michigan State House of Representatives for the 83rd District. Fitzgerald won his race on November 8, 2022 against Lisa DeKryger. Fitzgerald lives in the Wyoming, Michigan with his wife and daughter.

Early life, education, and career 
Fitzgerald grew up in Grand Ledge, Michigan. He graduated from Grand Ledge High School. Fitzgerald's mother is an ordained minister and his father, Frank Fitzgerald was an attorney and Michigan State Representative, serving from 1987-1998.

Fitzgerald graduated from Michigan State University with a degree in history.

Fitzgerald worked as an account executive in the insurance industry before being elected to the Michigan House of Representatives in 2022.

Political career

City Council 
Fitzgerald served on the Wyoming City Council between 2021-2022 as the member-at-large. He was elected in 2020 and won with 55.12% of the vote.

Michigan Legislature 
Fitzgerald serves in the Michigan State House of Representatives for the 83rd District, which includes portions of Wyoming, Grand Rapids, and Byron Township. He was elected in 2022 with 52.62% of the vote against Lisa DeKryger who received 44.53% of the vote.

References

External links 
 Rep. John Fitzgerald, Michigan House Democrats website
 John Fitzgerald for State Representative

Members of the Michigan House of Representatives
Michigan city council members
People from Wyoming, Michigan
Michigan State University alumni
1990 births
Living people
21st-century American politicians